Panaque schaeferi is a freshwater species of fish from the South American armoured catfish family Loricariidae. Panaque schaeferi is widely distributed throughout the upper Amazon (Solimões River) in Peruvian and Ecuadorian rivers, and it has been observed as far down as Santarém, Brazil. Growing to at least 60 cm (23.6 inches) SL, it is one of the largest, and likely one of the heaviest species of Loricariid. It has been known in the aquarium trade since at least 1996 under various names such as 'Titanic pleco' and 'Volkswagen pleco' (due to its resemblance to the VW Beetle car), in addition to L203 and LDA065 under the L-number code. Juveniles are often confused with Panaque bathyphilus and erroneously called L090c.

The fish is named in honor of Scott A. Schaefer of the American Museum of Natural History. Additionally, he is the ichthyological editor of Copeia for his many contributions to ichthyology in general, and in particular to the understanding of the Loricarioidea.

References

Ancistrini
Fish described in 2010
Catfish of South America
Freshwater fish of Brazil
Freshwater fish of Ecuador
Freshwater fish of Peru
Fish of the Amazon basin
Taxa named by Nathan Keller Lujan
Taxa named by Max Hidalgo
Taxa named by Donald J. Stewart